Oh Hyun-kyung (born Oh Sang-ji on March 25, 1970) is a South Korean actress.

Career
Oh Sang-ji won the 1989 Miss Korea beauty pageant, and represented her country at the Miss Universe 1990 pageant. She immediately rose to stardom. Using the stage name Oh Hyun-kyung, she received many television offers and began her acting career. She was also briefly an adjunct professor at Kongju Communication Arts College. But her career came to a halt in 1998 when a 28-minute video clip explicitly showing her having intercourse with her then-boyfriend was uploaded on file-sharing websites. Oh asked prosecutors to investigate the circumstances that led to the widespread circulation of the sex video, claiming that someone had earlier attempted to blackmail her for money. Despite proof that the video had been filmed without her consent and the boyfriend had released it with malicious intent, the scandal caused her to be harshly criticized in the media.

In 2001, she returned to Korea and later found herself in the public eye once again after a hush-hush wedding in September 2002 to Kemongsa president Hong Seung-pyo (the M&A specialist played by Bae Yong-joon in the TV series Hotelier was based on Hong). Oh gave birth to a daughter in 2003, and started a golf fashion business the year after. But in 2004 her husband Hong was arrested for embezzlement, leading to Oh divorcing him in June 2006.

Calling her 10-year self-imposed exile from the public limelight "a living nightmare," Oh returned to television in 2007 in the melodrama First Wives' Club. Her acting comeback was a success, and Oh has since starred in a succession of dramas, among them High Kick Through the Roof, Gloria, Miss Ajumma, The Great Seer, She Is Wow!, Wang's Family, 4 Legendary Witches, and The Bird That Sheds No Tears.

Filmography

Television series

Film

Variety show

Awards and nominations

References

External links

Oh Hyun-kyung at Huayi Brothers 

1970 births
Living people
DSP Media artists
Miss Korea winners
Miss Universe 1990 contestants
20th-century South Korean actresses
21st-century South Korean actresses
South Korean film actresses
South Korean television actresses
1998 scandals
Scandals in South Korea
Sex scandals
1998 in South Korea